Eugene Morris Alford (April 3, 1905December 1975) was a professional American football player who played running back in the NFL for four seasons for the Portsmouth Spartans and the Cincinnati Reds. Alford played for the Texas Tech Matadors (later known as Red Raiders) in 1925, Tech's first football season, and is listed in the Texas Tech football media guide as a one-year letterman. He later played professionally in the NFL for Portsmouth, Cincinnati and the St. Louis Gunners from 1931 to 1934.

References

1905 births
1975 deaths
People from Rising Star, Texas
Players of American football from Texas
American football running backs
Texas Tech Red Raiders football players
Portsmouth Spartans players
Cincinnati Reds (NFL) players
St. Louis Gunners players